Greenwich Pier is on the south bank of the River Thames in Greenwich, London. It was built in 1836 to cater for the many paddle steamers that brought visitors on day trips to Greenwich from London further up river. At the time, London's urban area did not extend as far out as Greenwich. 

The pier is currently operated by London River Services and is used by various river operators, running public cruise services to and from Central London. It is immediately adjacent to the Cutty Sark and is within easy walking distance of a variety of other popular attractions. It was refurbished in 2004 and again in March 2018.

Services
Greenwich Pier is a major stop for a number of river operators including:

 Thames Clippers, which operates a commuter catamaran service between Greenwich and Central London, via Embankment, Tower Millennium Pier and Canary Wharf. This service also extends down river to the O2 and Woolwich Arsenal Pier.
 Thames River Sightseeing, which operates sightseeing tours between Westminster Pier, Embankment Pier, Festival Pier, Bankside Pier, Tower Bridge Quay and Greenwich Pier. Thames River Sightseeing also operate cruises through the Thames Flood Barrier.
 City Cruises, which runs a tourist cruise via Westminster, Waterloo and Tower piers.
 Viscount Cruises (Campion Launches), which operates a sightseeing cruise on Sunday evenings from Greenwich Pier during May, June, July, August, and September.

Connections
 Cutty Sark station 
 London Buses 188, 199 and N1 
 Greenwich Foot Tunnel under the River Thames

Gallery

References

London River Services
Buildings and structures in the Royal Borough of Greenwich
Transport in the Royal Borough of Greenwich
Piers in London
Transport infrastructure completed in 1836